HNoMS Trondheim was a  destroyer built for the Royal Navy as HMS Croziers. She was built by Yarrow Shipbuilders, Scotstoun during 1944 and 1945. On completion she was sold to the Royal Norwegian Navy in 1946 and renamed Trondheim. She was scrapped in 1961.

Operational service
Commissioned too late for service in the Second World War, following sale her pennant number was changed to D305. She was one of four Cr-class destroyers sold to Norway. Unlike many other destroyers of this class, none of the Norwegian ships received any significant upgrades during their operational service.

Trondheim continued to serve in the Royal Norwegian Navy until removed from the active list in 1961.

References

Publications
 
 
 
 

 

1944 ships
Ships built on the River Clyde
C-class destroyers (1943) of the Royal Navy
Destroyers of the Royal Norwegian Navy